Cisco is an American technology conglomerate.

Cisco may also refer to:

Places
 Siska, British Columbia or Cisco, Canada

United States
 Cisco, California, a small town
 Cisco, Georgia, an unincorporated community
 Cisco, Illinois, a village
 Cisco, Kentucky, an unincorporated community
 Cisco, Minnesota, a former unincorporated community
 Lisco, Nebraska, a small town in western Nebraska, erroneously called "Cisco" by the United States Census Bureau in 2000
 Cisco, Texas, a city
 Cisco Group, a geologic group in Texas
 Cisco, Utah, a ghost town
 Cisco Oil Field, Utah
 Cisco, West Virginia, an unincorporated community

Companies
 Certis CISCO, corporatised entity of the former Commercial and Industrial Security Corporation in Singapore
 Cisco Brewers, a brewery, distillery and winery on Nantucket Island in Massachusetts, US
 Nissin Cisco Co. Ltd, a Japanese cereal and snack-food manufacturer, subsidiary of Nissin Foods
 Luzon Cisco Transport, Inc., a bus company which become part of Five Star Bus Company

Other uses 
 Cisco (name), a given name, nickname or surname (and a list of people with the name)
 Cisco (fish), certain Eurasian and North American salmonid freshwater whitefish in the genus Coregonus
 Cisco (Grand Theft Auto Advance), a character from Grand Theft Auto Advance
 USS Cisco (SS-290), World War II submarine
 Don Cisco or Cisco, Mexican-American rapper and producer
 Cisco College, a community college in Cisco, Texas, US
 Cisco Field, a proposed baseball stadium for the Oakland Athletics in California, US
 Cisco High School (Texas)
 Cisco, a brand of low-end fortified wine
 Cisco, an original composition performed on Pat Martino's 1967 album El_Hombre

See also
 The Cisco Kid, created by O. Henry
 Crisco, a brand of shortening
 Frisco (disambiguation)
 Sisko (disambiguation)
 Sisqó (born 1978), R&B singer
 Sysco, a foodservice distributor
 CSIRO (Commonwealth Scientific and Industrial Research Organisation)
 Gene Siskel, American film critic and journalist